Ibarrola is a village (pueblo) within the municipality of Aulesti, Biscay province, in the Basque Country of northeastern Spain.  As of 2004, it had a population of 86 inhabitants.

External links
Ibarrola Vizcaya Esuskadi Pais Vasco Pueblos y Ciudades de España 

Populated places in Biscay